Coast to Coast were a British band from Wellingborough, Northamptonshire, that was signed to Polydor Records. They are best known for their 1981 top 5 hit in the UK with "(Do) The Hucklebuck".

Career
The band were formed in 1977 by bassist Bud Smith and guitarist Bob Debank, who recruited Alan Mills as lead vocalist, Graham Woofe on drums and, later, saxophonist Sonnie Torlot. Earl Barton replaced Woofe at a later date.

The band's best-known single, a cover version of the rock and roll classic "The Hucklebuck", was recorded in 1980 and reached number 5 on the UK Singles Chart the following year. However, tensions surfaced between band members and Mills left before the song became successful, to be replaced by Sandy Fontaine (born Alex Giannini). Although the British Hit Singles & Albums book cites Fontaine as the singer for the single, it was actually Mills' vocal that appeared, with Fontaine's vocal dubbed onto the album version.

The follow-up release, a cover version of "Let's Jump the Broomstick", peaked at number 28 in June 1981.

The group disbanded in 1982. Smith and Torlot retain the performing rights to the band name and several line-ups have since been attempted with new members for live performances, but with little commercial success. The single "(Do) The Hucklebuck" has been made available on a number of various artists compilation CDs, to date: however, follow-up hit single "Let's Jump the Broomstick" and parent album Coastin''' have yet to be made available on CD.

Lead singer Alan Mills died on 21 July 2016, whilst replacement lead singer Sandy Fontaine (Alex Giannini) died on 2 October 2015.

Band members
 Alan Mills (vocals) 1975-1980
 Sandy Fontaine (vocals) 1980-1982
 Sonnie Torlot (sax, vocals) 1978-1982
 Jamie Ling (guitar, vocals) 1976-1982
 Bud Smith (bass, vocals) 1975-late 1979 then rejoining in 1980 to late 1982
 Earl Barton (drums) 1980-1982
 Bob Debank (guitarist, vocals) 1975-1979 (founder member along with Bud Smith) departed from the band before signing a record contract with Polydor.

Discography
AlbumsCoastin''' (1981)

Singles and EPs

References

External links
 [ Coast to Coast at AllMusic]

English rock music groups
British rock and roll music groups
Rockabilly music groups
Musical groups from Northamptonshire
Polydor Records artists